On the Road Again is the second studio album by French space rock band Rockets, released in April 1978.

Track listing

Personnel
Rockets
Christian Le Bartz – vocals
"Little" Gerard L'Her – bass, vocals; keyboards on "Cosmic Race"
Alain Maratrat – guitar, keyboards; vocals on "Space Rock"; synthesizers on "Astrolights" and "Electro-Voice"
Fabrice Quagliotti – keyboards
Alain Groetzinger – drums, percussion
Additional personnel
Claude Lemoine – production
Henri Arcens – engineering
Karl Heinz Schäfer – arrangements, vocals on "Futur Woman"
Zeus B. Held – vocoder on "On the Road Again"
Guido Harari – photography
Georges Spitzer – photography
Bruno Marzi – photography
Tom Moulton – mixing on "On the Road Again"

Release history

Certifications

References

1978 albums
Rockets (band) albums